Cats Protection, formerly the Cats Protection League, is a UK charity dedicated to rescuing and rehoming stray, unwanted or homeless cats and educating people about cats and cat welfare. The organization was founded as the Cats Protection League on 16 May 1927 by Jessey Wade, at a meeting in Caxton Hall, London. The name was shortened in 1998. The current Chief Executive is John May.

Aims
 To find good homes for cats in need
 To support and encourage the neutering of cats
 To improve people's understanding of cats and their care

Operations

In 2017, the charity helped nearly 193,000 cats (rehoming around 43,000 of these and neutering 153,000). Its network had 36 centres, 250+ volunteer-run branches, 121 charity shops and approximately 10,200 volunteers and staff located throughout the UK. The charity's income for 2017 was £62.9 million.

In 2011, the charity announced that it had helped more than one million cats over the previous five years, 80% of this figure being neutering and 20% being rehoming.

Alongside rehoming cats and kittens, the charity runs a neutering scheme for owners on a limited income, and a National Information Line (03000 12 12 12). In addition, they monitor (and feed) feral colonies in the area including trapping, neutering and re-releasing (where possible) feral cats back to where they came from. They also work to educate adults and children about cat welfare, and run talks and educational resource programmes across the UK.

Volunteer branches
The charity operates in two ways: volunteer-run branches and centres. The main difference is that volunteer-run branches are people with a spare room or space in a garden for a pen (or two). Instead of visiting a dedicated centre, the person wishing to adopt a cat usually visits it in another person's home. Anyone picking up a cat or kitten from a fosterer's home can be subject to same home visits (pre- and post-homing) and the same terms and conditions as someone picking up a cat or kitten from a centre. Volunteer-run branches receive a small amount of funding from the charity's headquarters but are required to raise most of their funds from their local areas. They do not usually have any paid members of staff, and would take the cats home if they had to.

Adoption centres
Dedicated centres are of varying size and have paid staff in addition to volunteers on their team. The vast majority of the public visit these places to adopt a cat or a kitten. Centres are funded centrally by the charity, though many also have "Friends of..." groups that raise funds locally. In addition, there is often the chance of cat sponsorship, where members of the public can sponsor a pen in return for a monthly or annual donation. Sponsors receive regular updates on the cats using their pens.

In 2002, Cat Protection acquired the Isle of Thorns estate from the University of Sussex. The estate is now the National Cat Centre.

In 2008, the charity was affected by the financial markets crisis emanating from Iceland, losing £11.2 million of its financial reserves. In 2012, having suffered continuing financial losses, the charity was forced to make over 80 staff redundant, the majority of these being staff working on the operational front line in adoption centres or supporting branches.

References

External links
 
 

1927 establishments in the United Kingdom
Animal charities based in the United Kingdom
Animal rescue groups
Animal welfare organisations based in the United Kingdom
Domestic cat welfare organizations
Organisations based in West Sussex
Organizations established in 1927